The Vasseti Group consists of multiple businesses in various fields, ranging from telecommunications to lifestyle concepts. As of 3 January 2011, the Vasseti Group began operations in its new corporate headquarters at Plaza Sentral, in close proximity with KL Sentral Station. This is also the same location as the Vasseti Concierge office on the ground floor which serves as Vasseti's front lines, providing information on anything and everything Vasseti-related.

In August 2010, Malaysian billionaire Tan Sri Datuk Sri Syed Yusof, Chairman of the Vasseti Group bought his own stake in the group - totaling at 30%. Also in August 2010, Vasseti introduced 1,000Mbit/s internet service to parts of Kuala Lumpur for RM199 per month. Chief Executive Officer of Vasseti, Ahmad Razmy Abdul Rashid, said that the new deployment will help web TV (sometimes referred to as IPTV or Internet-Protocol-Television), voice-over-internet-protocol (VoIP) as well as surveillance.

Most recently, the Vasseti Group had announced its acquisition of Templer Park Country Club (TPCC) located in Rawang, Selangor. Separated from the Main Clubhouse of TPCC is a smaller, secondary clubhouse.

Background
The Vasseti Group is a result of over a decade's worth of mergers and acquisitions of diversified businesses in multiple countries. It is said that under its first phase of consolidation, the group will be worth over US$1 billion in Malaysia, and will be part of a global corporation, Vasseti (UK) PLC.

Industries of Interest

Telecommunications
V-Telecoms serves as the telecommunications arm for the Vasseti Group. While working closely with the Information Technology arm of the group (mentioned below), V-Telecoms is known for being one of only three companies in Malaysia to possess a network telco license.With that, V-Telecoms claims to be the first nationwide Optical Metro Ethernet Network providing high-speed fibre optic internet connections, mainly to institutional users such as multinational corporations (MNCs), Internet Service Providers (ISPs), and certain government institutions.

Information and Communication Technology
The Information Technology or IT arm of the Vasseti Group is known as Vasseti Datatech or VDT. Vasseti Datatech recently grabbed local headlines when it officially launched its 1Gbit/s Community Broadband Service in selected locations in the Klang Valley at a low price of RM 199 per month, equivalent to about US$60 per month.  Aside from that, VDT also provides services in Rich Data Development, such as data centres, web hosting services, software engineering and more.

Leisure and Tourism
The Vasseti Group also caters to lifestyle concepts through its Vasseti Life Concepts (VLC) business. So far the main product that has been mentioned is the Vasseti Lifestyle Privilege Card which aims to provide cardholders with benefits in retail, food and beverage, travel, and more. Though this has been mentioned, no official launching has taken place yet.

Human Resource Outsourcing Services
The Vasseti Group is also involved in human resources outsourcing services through its VHRS wing. This wing basically seeks to cater to all human resource needs of its clients, from recruitment and payroll to training and development.
In addition to that, VHRS also operates an online job portal and provides human resources consulting to clients.
Other industries engaged by the Vasseti Group include real estate, tourism, finance, construction, plantations, automotive services, and security services.

Plantations
Through Vasseti Farmlands Berhad, the group is involved in key plantation commodities such as palm oil and rubber, though it is particular interested in the planting of Gaharu (Agarwood), a relatively new but equally significant plantation product.

Security Services
Vasseti Security (Malaysia) Berhad is aimed at providing various forms of security services to the commercial, industrial, as well as financial sectors. These services come in the form of 24/7 security guards, cash-in-transit (CIT) services, security audits, management and consultations, private investigation services, surveillance as well as remote monitoring, just to name a few.

Engineering and Construction
Vasseti Engineering Berhad (the group's engineering arm) specializes in designing and building projects, conducting geotechnical works, civil engineering projects, as well as mechanical and electrical works as well.

Real Estate

Automotive
As for the group's interest in the automotive industry, through Ezreen Auto Berhad, the group provides fleet management services to corporate clients and business enterprises. These services are broken down into four main segments: car rental, fleet rental, vehicle trade and contractual maintenance services.

References

Conglomerate companies of Malaysia
Telecommunications companies of Malaysia